Mann Pyasa is a Pakistani television family drama serial aired on TV One from 2 November 2016. It is produced and directed by Barkat Siddiqi under Promax Media. It stars Noman Ejaz, Mikaal Zulfiqar, Sarwat Gilani and Zhalay Sarhadi in lead roles.

Cast
Noman Ejaz as Zeeshan Shah
Mikaal Zulfiqar as Arib
Sarwat Gilani as Naveen
Zhalay Sarhadi as Sumaira
Qazi Wajid
Samina Ahmed
Irfan Motiwala
Barkat Siddiqi
Sheen Gul

References

External links
Mann Pyasa- IMDb

2016 Pakistani television series debuts